The 58th Filmfare Awards South ceremony honoring the winners and nominees of the best of South Indian cinema in 2010 was held on 2 July 2011 in Hyderabad, India.

Nominations
The following is a list of the award winners and nominees.

Multiple nominations and awards
The following films received multiple nominations.

Kannada

Nominations
 9 nominations: Jackie
 6 nominations: Aptharakshaka, Krishnan Love Story, Super
 4 nominations: Pancharangi

Awards
 3 awards: Aptharakshaka
 2 awards: Jackie, Krishnan Love Story

Malayalam

Nominations
 7 nominations: Kadha Thudarunnu
 5 nominations: Anwar, Cocktail, Elsamma Enna Aankutty, Marykkundoru Kunjaadu
 4 nominations: Mummy & Me, Pranchiyettan & the Saint

Awards
 3 awards: Anwar, Pranchiyettan & the Saint
 2 awards: Kadha Thudarunnu

Tamil

Nominations
 9 nominations: Aayirathil Oruvan
 7 nominations: Madrasapattinam, Vinnaithaandi Varuvaayaa
 6 nominations: Enthiran
 5 nominations: Angadi Theru, Paiyaa

Awards
 3 awards: 
Angadi Theru, Enthiran 
 2 awards: Raavanan, Vinnaithaandi Varuvaayaa

Telugu

Nominations
 7 nominations: Vedam, Ye Maaya Chesave
 6 nominations: Leader, Simha
 5 nominations: Adhurs, Brindavanam

Awards
 4 awards: Vedam
 3 awards: Ye Maaya Chesave (2)
 2 awards: Khaleja

 Number in brackets after the film title indicates the number of special awards included, which have no nominees.

Awardees
Winners in bold, nominees listed under.

Kannada

Malayalam

Tamil

Telugu

Other awards 
(No nominees for these awards)
Best Film (Critics) – Prasthanam
Best Female Debutant: Samantha – Ye Maaya Chesave (Telugu)
Best Male Debutant: Rana Daggubati – Leader (Telugu)
 Best Dance Choreographer: 
 Baba Bhaskar – "Kadhal Vandhale" – Singam (Tamil)
 Raju Sundaram – "Eyi Raaja" – Brindavanam (Telugu)
 Best Cinematographer:
 R. Rathnavelu – Enthiran (Tamil)
Manoj Paramahamsa – Ye Maaya Chesave (Telugu)
 Best Costume Design: Manish Malhotra – Enthiran (Tamil)
 Best Production Design: Sabu Cyril – Enthiran (Tamil)
 Lifetime Achievement Award: 
 Chiranjeevi
 Jayasudha

See also
Filmfare Awards South
Filmfare Awards
2010 in film

References

External links
 

Nominations
 58th Filmfare Awards South nominations

Filmfare Awards South
2011 Indian film awards